The Duša killings refers to the shelling of the village of Duša, Gornji Vakuf by the Croatian Defence Council on 18 January 1993, in which 7 Bosniak civilians were killed. Bosniak homes were burnt down after the HVO took control of the village.

Background
Gornji Vakuf is a town to the south of the Lašva Valley, which had a population of about 10,000 Croats and 14,000 Bosniaks. On 11 January 1993 the first clashes between the Croatian Defence Council (HVO) and the Army of the Republic of Bosnia and Herzegovina (ARBiH) took place. There are conflicting reports as to how the fighting started and what caused it; a bomb placed in a Muslim owned hotel used as a headquarters or an all-out attack by ARBiH forces on HVO positions.

On 16 January 1993 the HVO demanded that the ARBiH in Gornji Vakuf subordinate its troops to the HVO, which was rejected. On 18 January the HVO attacked ARBiH positions in Gornji Vakuf.

Attack on Duša

On 18 January the HVO attacked the ARBiH in the village of Duša, Gornji Vakuf. Civilians, including elderly people, women and children, took shelter in the house of Enver Šljivo during the combat. During the attack, the HVO artillery fired several shells from a nearby village, one of which hit the house of Enver Šviljo and killed 7 civilians, including three children, three women, and an older man who died as a result of his wounds. Many Bosniak houses were damaged from the shelling.

After the ARBiH surrendered, the women, children, elderly and handicapped people were sent to the nearby village of Paloč, where a doctor examined the wounded and sent the seriously injured to a hospital in Bugojno. Others remained in Paloč for several days until they were moved by the UNPROFOR. There is no evidence about the detention conditions in Paloč. After the takeover of the village, HVO soldiers set fire to an unknown number of houses. Bosniak men from Duša were transferred from Paloč to Trnovača and detained in a furniture factory. They were exchanged for prisoners taken by the ARBiH two weeks later.

See also
Croat-Bosniak War

References

Mass murder in 1993
1993 in Bosnia and Herzegovina
Croatian war crimes in the Bosnian War
January 1993 events in Europe
Conflicts in 1993
Massacres of Bosniaks